The following is a list of players who appeared in at least one game for the Boston Reds franchise, which played in the Union Association in .

β= indicates Baseball Hall of Famer.
$= indicates that this player was also a manager.
*= indicates that no other information is known on this player.



A

B
Tommy Bond
Lew Brown
James Burke
Kid Butler

C
Ed Callahan
Ed Crane

D
Charlie Daniels
Clarence Dow

E

F
Joe Flynn

G

H
Walter Hackett

I
John Irwin

J

K

L

M
Tommy McCarthy β
Jim McKeever
Henry Mullin
Tim Murnane $
Murphy*

N

O
Tom O'Brien

P
Elias Peak

Q

R
Charlie Reilley
John Rudderham

S
Pat Scanlon
Dupee Shaw
Art Sladen
Mike Slattery

T
Fred Tenney

U

V

W

X

Y

Z

External links
Baseball-Reference
Retrosheet

Major League Baseball all-time rosters